The Osman Ahmed Osman Stadium, also known as the Arab Contractors Stadium or Al-Mokawloon al-Arab Stadium, is a multi-use stadium used mostly for football matches in Nasr City, Cairo, Egypt, which has a seating capacity of 35,000. It is the home stadium of Al Mokawloon Al Arab, and acted as a temporarily home venue for various clubs in Egypt such as FC Masr and Misr Lel Makkasa.

The stadium previously hosted some matches involving the Egyptian national team between 2004 and 2011, and also hosted the second leg of the 2013 CAF Champions League Final between Al Ahly and Orlando Pirates.

References

Football venues in Egypt
Stadiums in Cairo
Sports venues completed in 1979
1979 establishments in Egypt
Al Mokawloon Al Arab SC
Football in Cairo